Heatter-Quigley Productions was an American television production company that was launched in 1960 by two former television writers, Merrill Heatter and Bob Quigley. After Quigley's retirement, the company became Merrill Heatter Productions.

History 
On many of Heatter-Quigley's most popular game shows, beginning with Video Village, a key element of the game was enlarged, and in some instances the entire game itself was magnified to larger than life.

 Video Village (later Shenanigans) employed a huge "living board game" motif that used contestants as tokens. (The popular late 1970s Canadian game show Mad Dash is similar to Video Village.)
 The Hollywood Squares  featured a massive tic-tac-toe board
 High Rollers used an extra large pair of dice in a game similar to "Shut the Box"
 Gambit had a large deck of playing cards in a game of blackjack
 The Magnificent Marble Machine featured a gigantic pinball machine
 Hot Seat used an oversized lie detector

In 1961, Heatter and Quigley entered into a partnership with Four Star Television to produce programming, and most of the assets were transferred to Four Star Television. In 1965, it became an independent television production company. In 1965, Heatter and Quigley created and aired a pilot episode of Hollywood Squares hosted by Bert Parks.  The show was rejected by CBS, but NBC acquired broadcasting rights to the series. (Peter Marshall became the host of The Hollywood Squares.) In 1969, Heatter and Quigley sold the show, as well as the entire company to Filmways television. In 1981, Quigley retired and ended his partnership with Merrill Heatter just before Filmways was bought by Orion Pictures. Quigley died on November 27, 1989. Heatter continued solo and produced new game shows, such as Battlestars, All-Star Blitz, Bargain Hunters, and the 1980s version of High Rollers. On September 28, 1998, Heatter leased the worldwide rights to his solo-developed game shows to King World for a limited time. That option has now expired. CBS Media Ventures and Fremantle owns the rights to Hollywood Squares today, via CBS's acquisition of King World Productions in 2000.

MGM Television acquired the rights from Orion Television to Heatter-Quigley shows with the exception of Hollywood Squares (which is currently owned by CBS Media Ventures and Fremantle) and Wacky Races (which currently owned by Warner Bros. Domestic Television Distribution (via Hanna-Barbera and Warner Bros. Animation)). Orion had sold those rights to King World Productions after Orion closed its television division on November 25, 1991. Today, the rest of the Heatter-Quigley library are owned by MGM Television's subsidiary, Orion Television.

In 2008, Heatter returned to game show production with the GSN game show Catch 21, based on Gambit. Heatter is co-executive producer with another veteran producer, Scott Sternberg. Heatter died of cancer on October 8, 2017.

Employees 
Kenny Williams was the announcer on all of Heatter-Quigley's game shows except two: Temptation (announced by Carl King) and The Magnificent Marble Machine (announced by Johnny Gilbert); both shows were hosted by Art James.

Many hosts would become famous for the shows they did for HQ. Peter Marshall became most famous for The Hollywood Squares, Wink Martindale would have his first big hit with Gambit, and Alex Trebek would see his first hit in America (after a long run with Reach for the Top in his native Canada) with High Rollers.

Titles by Heatter-Quigley Productions 
 Video Village/Video Village, Jr. (1960–1962)
 Double Exposure (1961)
 People Will Talk (1963) 
 The Celebrity Game (1964)     
 Shenanigans (1964–1965)
 PDQ (1966–1969)
 Showdown (1966)
 Hollywood Squares/Storybook Squares (1966–1981 version)
 Temptation (1967–1968)
 Funny You Should Ask (1968–1969)
 Wacky Races (1968–1970, co-produced with Hanna-Barbera Productions, rights owned by Warner Bros. Domestic Television Distribution (via Hanna-Barbera and Warner Bros. Animation); the only non-game show produced by the company, although it was intended to have a game show element)
 Name Droppers (1969)
 Gambit (1972–1976)
 Runaround (1972–1973); a British version of this show aired 1975–81
 The Amateur's Guide to Love (1972)
 Baffle (1973), a revival of PDQ.
 All-Star Baffle (1974), Baffle with "civilian" contestants playing the bonus round, picked from the studio audience.
 High Rollers (1974–1976; 1978–1980)
 The Magnificent Marble Machine (1975–1976)
 Hot Seat (1976)
 To Say the Least (1977–1978)
 Bedtime Stories (1979)
 Las Vegas Gambit (1980–1981)

Titles by Merrill Heatter Productions 
 Battlestars (1981–1982)
 Fantasy (1982–1983) (co-produced by Earl Greenberg Productions and Columbia Pictures Television)
 The New Battlestars (1983)
 All-Star Blitz (1985) (co-produced by Peter Marshall Enterprises)
 Bargain Hunters (1987) (co-produced by Josephson Communications, Inc.)
 High Rollers (1987–1988) (co-produced by Century Towers Productions and syndicated by Orion Television Syndication)
 The Last Word (1989–1990) (syndicated by Turner Program Services)
 Hollywood Teasers (1993; unsold revival of All-Star Blitz, distributed by MCA TV)
 Catch 21 (2008–2016, 2019–2020) (co-produced by Scott Sternberg Productions)

Notes and references 

Mass media companies established in 1960
Television production companies of the United States
Mass media companies disestablished in 1981
 
Former Metro-Goldwyn-Mayer subsidiaries
Filmways